Robert R. Hood is an American businessman and government official who is the vice president of government affairs and head of the Hyundai Motor Company's Washington, D.C. office. Hood previously served as assistant secretary of defense for legislative affairs (2017–2020).

Early life and education 
Hood was born in Kingston, Jamaica and grew up Marietta, Georgia. He is a graduate of the University of West Georgia.

Career 
Hood began his congressional career with Congressman Newt Gingrich as his senior legislative assistant and following the 1994 election, became an assistant to the speaker of the House of representatives for policy. In 1999, he joined the House Committee on Science as a professional staff member, where he worked on a number of issues relating to energy and environmental policy. Hood also served as the senior policy advisor to then-Governor Tommy Thompson in the state's DC office.

Hood was previously vice president for government affairs for CH2M. Past roles with the federal government include serving eight years in President George W. Bush's Administration, including at the White House, as a special assistant to the president in the Office of Legislative Affairs and at the  United States Department of Defense (2006–2008) as principal deputy assistant secretary for legislative affairs and as deputy under secretary of defense for budget and appropriations affairs. Hood was also the director of congressional affairs of the National Nuclear Security Administration from 2001 to 2006.

Personal life 
Hood lives in Alexandria, Virginia with his wife, four children and grandson.

References

External links
 Biography at Defense.gov

Living people
People from Marietta, Georgia
University of West Georgia alumni
United States Assistant Secretaries of Defense
Trump administration personnel
Year of birth missing (living people)